Singularia venedictoffi is a moth of the family Pterophoridae. It is found in Ecuador.

The wingspan is 18–20 mm. The head is scaled, mixed grey-white and dark brown and the face is dark brown, but slightly paler between the antennae. These are grey-brown. The thorax is dark brown with faint white-brown longitudinal lines. The forewings are dark chocolate brown with ferruginous-white faint lines at the base of the wing. The hindwings are dark brown. Adults have been recorded in March.

Etymology
The species is named after Mr. Nadian Venedictoff, who collected the species.

References

Moths described in 1994
Pterophorini